The Basler Turbo 37/Spectrum SA-550 is a twin-boom single engined aircraft converted from a Reims/Cessna FTB337G Skymaster by Basler Turbo Conversions and Spectrum Aircraft Corporation. The aircraft first flew on 1 February 1983.

Design and development
The Skymaster rear engine was replaced with a flat-rated  Pratt & Whitney Canada PT6 and front engine was removed and the cockpit was stretched forward.  The aircraft is capable of taking off in less than  fully loaded. Basler had a deal with the government of Thailand to convert their O-2 Skymaster to SA-550 and to convert civilian Skymaster in Thailand as well.  These plans appear to have never happened.

The aircraft is currently owned by Basler Turbo Conversions of Oshkosh, Wisconsin.

Specifications (SA-550)

References

External links
Basler Turbo 37 returns to the market
Janes article abstract

Basler aircraft
Twin-boom aircraft
1980s United States civil utility aircraft
Single-engined pusher aircraft
Single-engined turboprop aircraft
High-wing aircraft
Aircraft first flown in 1983